Also known by its English title Control, Optimisation and Calculus of Variations (COCV), it is a journal published by EDP Sciences on behalf of Société de Mathématiques Appliquées et Industrielles (SMAI) that specializes in articles on control theory, optimization, optimal control and calculus of variations.

References

Mathematics journals